Live is an album by American jazz trumpeter Terence Blanchard. The album was released on April 20, 2018, by Blue Note. This is the second album for Blanchard's band E-Collective, with Charles Altura on guitar, Fabian Almazan on piano and synthesizers, David Ginyard on bass, and Oscar Seaton on drums.

Background
Just as the preceding album Breathless, the present record explores the painful themes of racism, gun violence, and hate in the modern America. The E-Collective includes Blanchard on trumpet, playing alongside guitarist Charles Altura, pianist Fabian Almazan, drummer Oscar Seaton, and bassist David “DJ” Ginyard. The "Live" tour also featured Tondrae Kemp on vocals. Live’s tracks were recorded during the concerts performed in three cities where confrontations between the police and African Americans escalated into unconscionable tragedy. In Cleveland, a 12-year-old boy was fatally shot by police in 2014; in Dallas, five police officers were killed in an ambush in 2016; and in St. Paul, just days before the Dallas murders, a police officer fatally shot a black motorist during a traffic stop outside the city.

The five out of seven compositions in the album are written by Blanchard. Track 7 features the voice of Dr. Cornel West.

Reception
Lucas Phillips of The Boston Globe wrote "From the first moment of Terence Blanchard’s “Live,” a moody drone creeping up from beneath the applause, there is the unmistakable feeling that something drastic took place just before it. It's like the scene in a movie right after a violent climax where everyone is left to figure out what the heck just happened: Cue the music... The result is the honest, troubled vision of an onlooker trying to bring into sound the feelings of desolation, empowerment, anger, and confusion those incidents brought to their communities."

Sammy Stein of Something Else! noted "... a great album musically, and it is clear Terence Blanchard has surrounded himself with accomplished and devastatingly capable musicians, well able to interpret his compositional works. I would like to hear this in concert, as it feels a little like some of the energy and freneticism is lost in the recording. The noise is softened, the aggression somehow quieted, as if just a tad afraid to fully unleash. Any holding back of emotion, however, is made up for in the sheer musicality of the band. This is a great album, and one worthy of many listens." Writing for Offbeat, Geraldine Wyckoff commented, "Having such a vital theme and being performed in concert settings, Live shares a strong resemblance to a suite of music, as did Breathless. They stand together in purpose and passion."

Track listing

Personnel
Band
Terence Blanchard – keyboards, producer, trumpet
Fabian Almazan – keyboards, piano
Charles Altura – guitar (electric)
David Ginyard – bass (electric)
Oscar Seaton – drums
Tondrae Kemp – vocals (live)
Dr. Cornel West – spoken word
 
Production
Henry Adebonojo – photography
Robin Burgess – producer
Gavin Lurssen – mastering
Paul Moore – design
Andrew F. Scott – cover art
Frank Wolf – engineer, mixing, producer
Tondrae Kemp – tour manager

Chart performance

References

External links

2018 albums
Terence Blanchard albums
Blue Note Records albums